PRB may refer to:

Companies and organizations
 Periodic Review Board
 Population Reference Bureau
 Poudreries Réunies de Belgique, former Belgium armaments manufacturer
 PRB (company), Australian Automotive Manufacturer
 PRB, French Coatings Company
 Pre-Raphaelite Brotherhood of artists
 PRB Sailing Team
 Polish Business Council (Polska Rada Biznessu in Polish)

Politics
 Brazilian Republican Party (Partido Republicano Brasileiro, in Portuguese)
 Parti Rakyat Brunei, former political party in Brunei

Science
 Retinoblastoma protein, pRb, an important tumour-suppressor gene in retinoblastoma
 Progesterone receptor B

Other uses
 Paso Robles Municipal Airport, IATA designation
 People’s Republic of Bangladesh
 People's Republic of Benin
 People's Republic of Bulgaria
 Permeable reactive barrier, for groundwater remediation
 Physical Review B, physics journal
 Powder River Basin, US
 PRB (vessel)
 The unofficial ISO 4217 code for the Transnistrian rubla